Cteniopus is a genus of comb-clawed beetles belonging to the family Tenebrionidae subfamily Alleculinae.

Species
 Cteniopus impressicollis Fairmaire, 1892
 Cteniopus intrusus Seidlitz, 1896
 Cteniopus neapolitanus Baudi, 1877
 Cteniopus punctatissimus Baudi, 1877
 Cteniopus sulphureus (Linnaeus, 1758)
 Cteniopus sulphuripes (Germar, 1824)

References

 Biolib
 Fauna Europaea

Alleculinae
Tenebrionidae genera